A Tale of Two Mozzies is a 2007 Danish animated children's film directed by Jannik Hastrup and Flemming Quist Møller, from a screenplay by Møller. Produced by Marie Bro of Dansk Tegnefilm, A Tale of Two Mozzies was based on the eponymous series of children's books by Møller. Hastrup and Møller previously directed the 1971 film Benny's Bathtub. A Tale of Two Mozzies was released in Danish cinemas on 8 June 2007 by Nordisk Film Distribution. It was followed by a second film based on Møller's books in 2014, entitled Mini and the Mozzies.

Premise 
Dagmar, a dancing mosquito, is in love with mosquito Egon, however Egon is too busy achieving the ultimate sprint on his bicycle and wants to see the world. But when the evil red ant Queen Dominella and her soldiers kill the black ant Queen and take over the heap, Dagmar, Egon and their friends must pot their differences aside and use their talents to save the colony.

Voice cast 
The voice cast for the film, as per the Danish Film Institute:
Fabian August Harlang as Egon
Selma Quist Møller as Dagmar
Bjarke Kastberg Andersen as the Mini-Boy
Peter Frödin as Didrik von Drone
Ellen Hillingsø as Queen Flora
Lisbet Dahl as Queen Dominella
Claus Ryskjær as Working Ant Brian
Ole Thestrup as the Soldier Ant Knud
Esben Pretzmann as the Soldier Ant Harald
Kaya Brüel as Queen Lilleskat
Ditte Gråbøl as Myra and Kate
Laila Miermont as Maren the milkmaid
Marie Helger as Sensitiva de Luxe Anne
Kim Larsen as Børge Bøf
Christian Sievert as the Caterpillar
Jesper Klein as the snot beetle

References

External links 

2007 films
2007 animated films
2000s children's animated films
Danish animated films
2000s Danish-language films